Sarah Mian is a Canadian writer. Her debut novel When the Saints, published in 2015, won two Atlantic Book Awards and was a top three finalist for the 2016 Stephen Leacock Award.

She has also published short stories, poetry and non-fiction work in literary and general interest magazines, and was a contributor to the CBC Radio One program Definitely Not the Opera.

Originally from Dartmouth, Nova Scotia, she is currently a resident of the rural community of Queensland in the Halifax Regional Municipality.

References

External links

21st-century Canadian novelists
21st-century Canadian short story writers
21st-century Canadian poets
Canadian women novelists
Canadian women poets
Canadian women short story writers
People from Dartmouth, Nova Scotia
Writers from Halifax, Nova Scotia
Living people
21st-century Canadian women writers
Year of birth missing (living people)